This article presents the complete oeuvre of American bassist, composer and music producer Bill Laswell, including his work as a band member and collaborating artist. Laswell has an expansive and eclectic discography and has been involved in hundreds of recordings with many artists from across the world. Laswell's music is influenced by a plethora of musical genres, such as funk, world music, jazz, drum and bass, dub and ambient music. Starting in 1978, Laswell has built a reputation as an accomplished bass player and composer. He has also had a prolific career as a music producer and sound engineer, overseeing the recording process of diverse musical acts such as Sly and Robbie, Afrika Bambaataa, Bernie Worrell, Blind Idiot God, Henry Threadgill and Buckethead.

As a Solo artist

Studio albums

Under a pseudonym

Collaborative albums

Remix albums

Cover albums

Compilation albums

Soundtracks

Singles

Axiom Series

As a band member

Studio albums

Live albums

Compilation albums

Bass Guitar credits

Production credits

Other credits

References
General

 

Notes

External links
 
    
 Bill Laswell Discography
 Bill Laswell at Discogs

Discographies of American artists
Rock music discographies
Production discographies